"Fantasy" is a song by American band Earth, Wind & Fire, which was issued as a single in 1978 by Columbia Records.

Overview
"Fantasy" was produced by Maurice White, who also composed the song with Eddie Del Barrio and Verdine White. The song took three months to compose, and was only finally finished after Maurice White saw and was inspired by the film Close Encounters of the Third Kind.

The US B-side of the single was a song called "Be Ever Wonderful", while the UK B-side was a song called "Runnin". "Fantasy", "Be Ever Wonderful", and "Runnin" were all featured on EWF's 1977 studio album All 'n All.

Critical reception
Blues and Soul also declared that "Play it loud and it'll fill any dance floor". Joe McEwen of Rolling Stone wrote "The lyrics of “Fantasy” (“Come to see, victory, in the land called fantasy”) may be hard to swallow, but the music is as close to elegance as any funk song has come. Voices and a light touch of strings suddenly appear over a choppy, propulsive track, swell and swoop, only to disappear at the snap of a finger and pop up moments later for an exciting, powerful finale. White also utilizes an odd instrumental mix that gives equal emphasis to percussion (except the bass drum, which is usually played down), bass, rhythm guitars and stabbing, staccato horn bursts. The result is light but substantial, and it’s become a model for many other bands." Barry Cain of Record Mirror placed Fantasy as one of his four Records of the Week saying "Decontaminated warp factor three faar out felony with a smack of glossy metallic reverence, EW&F transcend the oft restricted peaks of disco into the realms of elaborate, effortless slices of electromania fused into chocolate box acceptance. They sure soar these boys, soaring on the soprano solitude of Maurice White, Mastermind, Mother and Despot." Alex Henderson of AllMusic also called Fantasy "dreamy".  Record World said that "the horn arrangement and soaring vocals are the chief hook."

"Fantasy" was nominated for a Grammy award in the category of Best R&B Song.

Appearances in other media
Fantasy appeared on the soundtrack of the 1981 feature film Private Lessons, the 1997 feature film The Sixth Man, the 2005 feature film Be Cool and the 2006 video game Grand Theft Auto: Vice City Stories. It also appears in the second season Bob's Burgers episode, "Bad Tina" (2012) and at the end of the 2020 Disney+ movie, Godmothered.

Chart performance
The single reached No. 12 on the Billboard Hot Soul Songs chart, No. 32 on the Billboard  Hot 100 chart and No. 14 on the UK Singles chart.

After its release in Japan as a digital single to cellphones in 2009, it was certified gold for 100,000 downloads in May 2011.

Charts

Black Box version

In 1990, Italian group Black Box recorded a cover of "Fantasy" for their debut studio album, Dreamland (1990). Their version featured Martha Wash on lead vocals, but their music producers initially failed to credit her. It also contains a sample from the drum pattern of Grace Jones' rendition of "La Vie en rose" (1977). Black Box's version of the song charted at number five in the UK Singles Chart, number 16 in Germany, and number three in Australia. In 2013, Australian music channel Max included Black Box' version of the song in their list of "1000 Greatest Songs of All Time".

Critical reception
In an retrospective review, Matthew Hocter from Albumism stated that the song is "sung to perfection" by Martha Wash, remarking that it "put the band into a different lane. Doing the original version immense justice". Upon the single release, Bill Coleman from Billboard named it one of the "highlights" from the album. Another editor, Larry Flick, described it as a "sleaze-speed house rendition" and an "ethereal remix emphasizing plush strings and Martha Wash's unmistakable voice." Ernest Hardy from Cashbox also named the song a "standout" from the album.

On the single review, Henderson and DeVaney said it is "an example of dance music as it should be—moving, inspired, richly expressive. A belter, the big-voiced Martha Wash brings a great deal of emotion, depth and soul to this inspired remake." The Daily Vault's Michael R. Smith felt that it "sounds like a television theme song that you can't get out of your head." Andrew Smith from Melody Maker called it a	"nauseous version". Chris Heath from Smash Hits declared it as a "fairly faithful version" of Earth, Wind & Fire's disco classic.

Music video
The accompanying music video for "Fantasy" was directed by Neil Thompson.

Track listings
 CD maxi and 12-inch maxi - Remixed
 "Fantasy" (club mix) – 7:20
 "Get Down" Black Box featuring "Stepz" (rap mix) – 6:43
 "Get Down" Black Box featuring "Stepz" (Rappapella) – 3:00

 7-inch single
 "Fantasy" – 3:44
 "Get Down" Black Box featuring "Stepz" (Rappapella) – 3:00

 7-inch single - Remixed
 "Fantasy" (Remixed 7-inch) – 3:44
 "Get Down" Black Box featuring "Stepz" (rap mix edit) – 3:34

 CD maxi - Remixed
 "Fantasy" (remixed 7-inch) – 3:44
 "Get Down" Black Box featuring "Stepz" (rap mix) – 6:43
 "Fantasy" (club mix) – 7:20

 12-inch maxi
 "Fantasy" (Big Band remix) – 5:48
 "Get Down" Black Box featuring "Stepz" (Party remix) – 3:55
 "Get Down" Black Box featuring "Stepz" (Afro mix) – 4:15

Charts

Weekly charts

Year-end charts

Certifications

References

1977 songs
1978 singles
1990 singles
Black Box (band) songs
Earth, Wind & Fire songs
English-language Italian songs
Songs written by Maurice White
Columbia Records singles
Polydor Records singles
RCA Records singles
Songs written by Verdine White
Songs written by Eddie del Barrio